Campo Felice is a karstic plateau  in the central Apennines, included in the province of L'Aquila, Abruzzo, central Italy.

Included in the communal territories of Lucoli and Rocca di Cambio, in the Sirente-Velino Regional Park, it is geographically bounded by the Velino-Sirente chain, with the other plains of Piani di Pezza and Altopiano delle Rocche located nearby. Campo Felice is situated at some 1500 m above the sea level, and has the shape of a basin. Vegetation is scarce, mostly composed by beech woods in the surrounding mountains slopes.

Temperatures can reach -30° C in winter. It is the seat of the eponymous Tre Nevi ski resort.

See also
Campo Imperatore

External links
Ski resort official website 

Plateaus of Italy
Landforms of Abruzzo
Ski areas and resorts in Italy